Simon King may refer to:

Simon King (musician) (born 1950), English drummer, former member of Hawkwind
Simon King (broadcaster) (born 1962), British television presenter, known for wildlife work
Simon King (footballer) (born 1983), English footballer
Si King (born 1966), British television presenter, known from the show The Hairy Bikers' Cookbook
Simon King (cricketer) (born 1987), English cricketer
Simon King (comedian), North American stand up comic
Simon King (meteorologist), English meteorologist and Royal Air Force officer
Simon K. King (born 1986), Indian film composer